Stephen Harris (born 5 July 1980) is a South African cricket umpire. He has stood in matches in the Sunfoil Series tournament. He is part of Cricket South Africa's umpire panel for first-class matches.

References

External links
 

1980 births
Living people
South African cricket umpires
Place of birth missing (living people)